Eclipse is the fourth studio album by Christian metal band Wolves at the Gate. The album was produced by Stephen Cobucci, Joey Alarcon, and Tim Lambesis, and released on July 26, 2019 by Solid State Records.

Reception
Eclipse received generally positive reviews, with Adam Cox of Metal Nexus saying that the album "brims with intent to be tuneful, thoughtful and emotional whilst retaining some brutal riffing."

Track listing
All songs written and composed by Steve Cobucci

Personnel 
Wolves at the Gate
Steve Cobucci – rhythm guitar, clean vocals 
Ben Summers – bass guitar, backing vocals
Nick Detty – unclean vocals, piano 
Abishai Collingsworth – drums 
Joey Alarcon – lead guitar

Additional personnel

 Adam Skatula – A&R 
 Ryan Clark – artwork, design
 Dominic Nastasi – engineer (drums), producer (drum pre-production)
 Mike Watts – engineer (drums), producer (drum pre-production)
 Brandon Ebel – executive production
 Cory Hadje w/ Royal Division Entertainment – management 
 Taylor Larson – mixing, mastering
 Ernie Slenkovich – mixing
 Joey Alarcon - production, engineering
 Steve Cobucci - production, engineering
 Tim Lambesis – production, engineering

Charts

References

2019 albums
Solid State Records albums
Wolves at the Gate (band) albums